The Güvenlik Tunnel is a road tunnel constructed on the Tirebolu–Gümüşhane state highway  in Giresun Province, northeastern Turkey. It was opened to traffic in 2008.

Situated near Güvenlik village of Doğankent district in Giresun Province on the route to Kürtün, Gümüşhane, the -long tunnel carries one lane of traffic in each direction in one tube. The tunnel enables an easy access between Black Sea Region to Eastern Anatolia Region through the Pontic Mountains.

References

Road tunnels in Turkey
Transport in Giresun Province